The Great Rock 'n' Roll Swindle is a 1980 British mockumentary film directed by Julien Temple and produced by Don Boyd and Jeremy Thomas. It centres on the British punk rock band Sex Pistols and, most prominently, their manager Malcolm McLaren.

Synopsis
Guitarist Steve Jones plays a shady private detective who – through a series of set piece acts – uncovers the truth about the band. Drummer Paul Cook and bass guitarist Sid Vicious play smaller roles, and the band's manager, Malcolm McLaren, is featured as "The Embezzler", the man who manipulates the Sex Pistols. Fugitive train robber Ronnie Biggs, performer Edward Tudor-Pole, sex film star Mary Millington, and actresses Irene Handl and Liz Fraser also make appearances. Singer and frontman Johnny Rotten refused to have anything to do with the film, stating that it was "a pile of rubbish" and "Malcolm's vision of what he believed – not true in any form".

The movie tells a stylised fictional account of the formation, rise and subsequent break-up of the band, from the point of view of their then-manager McLaren. In the film, McLaren claims to have created the Sex Pistols (in truth, they were already formed, and Jones and Cook asked him to be their manager), and manipulated them to the top of the music business, using them as puppets to both further his own agenda (in his own words: "Cash from chaos"), and to claim the financial rewards from the various record labels the band were signed to during their brief existence – EMI, A&M, Virgin, and Warner Bros. Records.

Cast
Malcolm McLaren – The Embezzler
Steve Jones – The Crook
Paul Cook – The Tea-Maker
Sid Vicious – The Gimmick
Johnny Rotten – The Collaborator (archive footage)
Ronnie Biggs – The Exile
Irene Handl – Cinema Usherette
Mary Millington – Mary
Liz Fraser – Woman in Cinema
Jess Conrad – Jess
Helen of Troy – Helen
Edward Tudor-Pole – Tadpole
James Aubrey – B.J.
Johnny Shannon – Ed Bird
Faye Hart – Soo Catwoman 
Peter Dean - Nightclub Bouncer (uncredited)
James Jeter – Martin Bormann (uncredited)

In addition, the film also includes appearances by musician Dave Dee and reporter Alan Jones as themselves.

Background
The title of the movie was inspired by an article written by Skiffle musician Lonnie Donegan in the 1950's titled "Rock and Roll - It's a Swindle". A copy of the article resides in the Jamie Reid archive at the V&A.

The footage was filmed in early to mid-1978, between the departure of singer John Lydon from the band and their subsequent split. The movie was finally released nearly two years later. Lydon (who was listed in the credits as "The Collaborator") and original bass guitarist Glen Matlock only appear in archive footage — Lydon refused to have anything to do with the production.

The film was shown at the wake of Joy Division frontman Ian Curtis after his 1980 suicide.

The 2000 documentary The Filth and the Fury, also directed by Julien Temple, re-tells the story of the Sex Pistols from the perspective of the band, thus serving as a response to and rebuttal of McLaren's insistence that he was the driving creative force of the band.

Home video releases
"The Swindle Continues in Your Own Home" was the tagline on the original 18 certificate UK VHS release from Virgin Video in 1982. Warner/Reprise Video released the film on US home video in 1992. In 2005, the film was released on DVD by Shout Factory.

Certifications

See also
"Belsen Was a Gas"
Great Reality TV Swindle
The Great Rock 'n' Roll Swindle (album)
Who Killed Bambi?

References

External links
 DVD review
 The Great Rock and Roll Swindle remembered by McLaren employee Sue Steward
 

1980 films
British mockumentary films
Sex Pistols video albums
British rock music films
Punk films
Films directed by Julien Temple
British anthology films
Compilation films
1980s exploitation films
Films with live action and animation
Films produced by Jeremy Thomas
1980 directorial debut films
1980s English-language films
1980s British films